This is a list of works about Lem. For a list of works of Lem, see List of works by Stanisław Lem and their adaptations
 

This bibliography of  Stanisław Lem is a list of works about Stanisław Lem, a Polish science fiction writer and essayist.

In addition to books and numerous academic articles, Lem's works and ideas have been a subject of  a number of Ph.D. and master theses.

Books about Lem
 2021: Lech Keller, Stanisław Lem w PRL-u czyli niewygodna prawda w zwiększonej objętości - Stanisław Lem in the People's Republic of Poland, or the Inconvenient Truth in an Enlarged Volume) - Acta Polonica Monashiensis (Monash University: Melbourne, Victoria, Australia) Volume 5 Number 1  - The inconvenient truth that Stanisław Lem was for a long time the 'pet' of the communist regime
 2021: Lech Keller, Lem Little Known  - Acta Polonica Monashiensis (Monash University: Melbourne, Victoria, Australia) Volume 4 Number 1  - Biography of Lem in English LEM LITTLE KNOWN
2021: Agnieszka Gajewska, Stanisław Lem. Wypędzony z Wysokiego Zamku (Stanislaw Lem. Banished from the High Castle) Wydawnictwo Literackie, Kraków, 
 2019: Lech Keller, Wstęp do Lemologii (Introduction to Lemology) - Acta Polonica Monashiensis (Monash University: Melbourne, Victoria, Australia) Volume 3 Number 1  - about lemology and lemologists
 2019: Lech Keller, Przyczynek do biografii Stanisława Lema (Contribution to Biography of Stanislas Lem) - Acta Polonica Monashiensis (Monash University: Melbourne, Victoria, Australia) Volume 3 Number 2  
2017: Wojciech Orliński, Lem. Życie nie z tej ziemi ("Lem. Life Not From This World") - this is the second book of Orliński about Lem. The book cover states that this is the first biography of Lem published in Poland. The author uncovered a considerable amount of little-known information about Lem's life.; Russian translation: "Лем. Жизнь на другой Земле" (Fanzon, 2019)
2017: Andrzej Wasilewski, Teoria literatury Stanisława Lema ("Stanislaw Lem's Theory of Literature"), Forma, Szczecin, 2017, 
2016: Agnieszka Gajewska, Zagłada i gwiazdy Przeszłość w prozie Stanisława Lema. Wydawnictwo Naukowe UAM, Poznań, 
Agnieszka Gajewska was first to uncover many unknown documents concerning Lem's life during World War II, which has long been a mystery. Lem simply refused to speak about these times. Gajewska demonstrates that events of these times were encoded in various hints in Lem's fiction. 
2015: Геннадий Прашкевич, Владимир Борисов (Gennadiy Prashkevich, Vladimir Borisov), Станислав Лем ("Stanislav Lem"), Moscow: Молодая гвардия (Molodaya gvardiya), Series: Zhizn zamechatelnykh lyudiey (Life of Remarkable Persons) 
A reviewer points out numerous and overly generous (sometimes full pages) quotations of Lem, although he remarks that Lem can often explain Lem better than others. 
 2015: Peter Swirski, Stanislaw Lem: Philosopher of the Future, 
2014: Язневич В.И. (Jaznewich W.I.), Станислав Лем ("Stanisław Lem"), Minsk (Belarus): Книжный Дом, Series: Мыслители ХХ столетия  (Thinkers of the Twentieth Century) 
 2013: Peter Swirski, From Literature to Biterature: Lem, Turing, Darwin, and Explorations in Computer Literature, Philosophy of Mind, and Cultural Evolution
" I’m trying to explore the ultimate future of literature by exploring the nature of beings who will create it. If my scenario is correct, “biterature,” as written by computer authors or “computhors,” will be a manifestation of the beginning of the end of the cultural world as we know it. In that sense, From Literature to Biterature is really a book about our human future in the age of thinking machines."
2010: Lech Keller: Visions of the future in the writings of Stanisław Lem, Saarbrücken: Lap Lambert
 Vol. 1: "Visions of the Future"  
 Vol. 2: "Annotated and Cross-Referenced Primary and Secondary Bibliography of Stanisław Lem" 
2010: Paweł Okołowski, MATERIA I WARTOŚCI. NEOLUKRECJANIZM STANISŁAWA LEMA 978-83-235-0664-5
2010: Wojciech Michera, Piękna jako bestia. Przyczynek do teorii obrazu, 
2009: Tomasz Lem, Awantury na tle powszechnego ciążenia ("Tantrums on the Background of the Universal Gravity"),  Wydawnictwo Literackie, Kraków, 272pp. 
2007: Paweł Majewski, Między zwierzęciem a maszyną. Utopia technologiczna Stanisława Lema, 978-83-229-2854-7
2007: Wojciech Orliński,  Co to są sepulki?  Wszystko o Lemie ("What Are Sepulki? Everything About Lem"), Wydawnictwo Znak, Kraków 2007,  
A wealth of answers about words invented by Lem, origins of Lem's ideas, peculiarities of plot elements, and other details interesting for Lem's fans 
Despite the catchy title, the book is a collection of biographical and bibliographical factoids without coherent, continuous narrative. The second book of the author about Lem (2017) is a considerably more thorough work.
2006 (also a 2016 expanded edition): Marek Oramus, Bogowie Lema (Gods of Lem) , a collection of essays and interviews which show a less hagiographical and more controversial image of Lem, plus a short story "Miejsce na Ziemi", which is an unusual interpretation of Lem's Return from the Stars
2006: Maciej Płaza, O POZNANIU W TWÓRCZOŚCI STANISŁAWA LEMA, 
2005: Maciej Dajnowski, GROTESKA W TWÓRCZOŚCI STANISŁAWA LEMA, 
2003: Jerzy Jarzębski, Wszechświat Lema  
Ten texts on a number selected topics in works of Lem and on forms of his writings: political aspects of Lem's science fiction, on the role of chance in Lem's concept of reality and in his axiology, about the history of the Reason and the technological evolution, about relationship with religion, about the problem of communication with the aliens, about the particularity of Lem's essay writing, its transformations and connection with literary prose. 
 2001: Peter Swirski, "Between Literature and Science: Poe, Lem, and Explorations in Aesthetics, Cognitive Science, and Literary Knowledge"
1997: Zygmunt Tecza, Das Wortspiel in der Übersetzung: Stanislaw Lems Spiele mit dem Wort als Gegenstand interlingualen Transfers ("The wordplay in the translation : Stanislaw Lem's plays with the word as an object of interlingual transfers"), 1997 (Max Neimeyer Verlag), reprinted 2011 (Walter de Gruyter) 
The work analyzes  1395 Polish-language and 1736 German-language puns from eight original works by Stanislaw Lem and their translations into German.
 1998: Mariusz M. Leś, Stanisław Lem wobec utopii, 1998, 
 The book is based on master's thesis of the author. It analyses numerous utopias and dystopias in Lem's novels and short stories.
 1996: Małgorzata Szpakowska, DYSKUSJE ZE STANISŁAWEM LEMEM, 
 1995: , Stanislaw Lem, 
The book is focused on Lem's worldview. 
 1995 Pavel Weigel, Stanisław Lem. Životopis (Stanisław Lem. A Biography) Praha: Magnet Press
 1994: Piotr Krywak, Fantastyka Lema: droga do "Fiaska", Krakow, 1994, 
 1990: J. Madison Davis, Stanislaw Lem San Bernardino (Calif., US) & Mercer Island (Washington, US): Starmont House, Series: Starmont Reader’s Guide Nr. 32
 1990 Andrzej Stoff, Lem i inni. Szkice o polskiej science fiction (Lem and the Others. Sketches on Polish SF) Bydgoszcz: Wydawnictwo “Pomorze”
 1987 Stanisław Bereś, Rozmowy ze Stanisławem Lemem (Conversations with Stanisław Lem) Kraków: Wydawnictwo Literackie (Subject: A book-length interview with Lem about his life and writings)
 1986 Stanisław Bereś Lem über Lem. Gespräche Frankfurt am Main: Insel Verlag - German translation of Rozmowy ze Stanisławem Lemem (Conversations with Stanisław Lem) Kraków: Wydawnictwo Literackie, 1987
 1986 Wolfgang Thadewald, Stanislaw Lem - Bibliographie für den deutschen Sprachraum (Bibliography of Lem's Works in the German Language) in: Florian Marzin, (ed.) Stanislaw Lem: An den Grenzen der SF und darüber hinaus Meitingen: Corian
 1985 Florian F. Marzin  (ed.). Stanislaw Lem: An den Grenzen der Science Fiction und darüber hinaus (Stanisław Lem: On Borders of SF and Beyond) Meitingen: Corian-Verlag Heinrich Wimmer
 1985:  Richard E. Ziegfeld, Stanislaw Lem NY: Frederick Ungar Publishing Company
 1983: Andrzej Stoff, Powieści fantastyczno-naukowe Stanisława Lema (SF novels of S. Lem) 
 1973: Ewa Balcerzak, Stanisław Lem Warszawa: Agencja Autorska (Authors’ Agency) - translated by: Krystyna Cekalska from Stanisław Lem Warszawa: PIW, 1973
 1973: Ewa Balcerzak, Stanisław Lem Warszawa: Państwowy Instytut Wydawniczy (PIW)

Collections of articles and essays about Lem
2015: Quart magazine, no. 3-4, 247pp. 
A special issue of the quarterly of the Institute of the History of Arts, Wroclaw University, with materials from the 2015 lemological conference, Wroclaw
2014: Lemography: Stanislaw Lem in the Eyes of the World, 
The collections essays focus on Lem's contributions to philosophy and literary theory.
2011: Lem i tłumacze ("Lem and Translators")  
A collection of descriptions of the reception of Lem's works in several dozens of languages
2009: Stanisław Lem: horyzonty wyobraźni, a special issue, Bez Porównania, 1(7), 2009 - materials of a 2007 conference 
2008: The Art and Science of Stanislaw Lem, 
Materials of two joint German-Polish conferences devoted to Lem, in Krakow (1999) and in Szczecin and Greifswald (2000), were published in two languales, in two slightly different collections of the essays:
2003: Stanisław Lem: Pisarz, myśliciel, człowiek  
2005: Stanisław Lem: Mensch, Denker, Schriftsteller, Beiträge einer deutsch-polnischen Konferenz im Jahr 2000 in Greifswald und Szczecin, Volume 48 of Opera Slavica, ISSN 0085-4514, 
I. Das Gesamtwerk und seine Grundlagen: J. Jarzebski, Naturliches, Kunstliches und das Loch im Himmel; P. Czaplinski, Stanislaw Lem - Die Spirale des Pessimismus 
II. Gattungen und Schreibweisen: A. Ohme, Phantastik - Science Fiction - Utopie: Versuch einer Begriffsabgrenzung (am Beispiel ausgewahlter Texte Stanislaw Lems); M. Dajnowski, Zu den Problemen der Groteske Lems. Uber die allgemeine Zudringlichkeit der Drachen der Wahrscheinlichkeit; E. Szczepkowska, Das Spiel mit der Autobiographie in Stanislaw Lems Wysoki Zamek; Christian Prunitsch, Zyklisierende Faktoren in Stanislaw Lems Dzienniki gwiazdowe 
III. Genderfragen: M. Glasenapp, Femina Astralis - Weiblichkeit in der wissenschaftlichen Phantastik Stanislaw Lems; U. Jekutsch, Das Geschlecht der Maschine: Geschlechterdifferenz in Stanislaw Lems Erzahlungen "Rozprawa" und "Maska" 
IV. Intertextualitat: A. Fiut, Ein Sarmate in der Zeitmaschine - Stanislaw Lem als Leser; P. Michalowski, Das Babel des 21. Jahrhunderts: Die Bibliotheken Stanislaw Lems und Jorge Luis Borges'; J. Zielinski, Spuren einer Rilke-Lekture im Werk Lems
2003: Acta Lemiana Monashiensis - Special Lem Edition of Acta Polonica Monashiensis (edited by Lech Keller, Wojciech Kajtoch and Lila Zarnowski), 
1997: A Stanislaw Lem Reader (edited by Peter Swirski)
 From book annotation: "This collection assembles in-depth and insightful writings by and about, and interviews with, one of the most fascinating writers of the twentieth century." It also includes Lem's bibliography
1989: LEM W OCZACH KRYTYKI ŚWIATOWEJ,   
A collection of essays

Interviews
1979:  Lem, S.: "Interview with Zoran Živković: The Future Without a Future." In: Pacific Manoa Quarterly 4/258, 1979
1986: Istvan Csicsery-Ronay, Jr., "Twenty-Two Answers and Two Postscripts: An Interview with Stanislaw Lem", Science Fiction Studies, #40 = Volume 13, Part 3 = November 1986 
1987: Conversations with Stanisław Lem, (Rozmowy ze Stanisławem Lemem, Stanisław Bereś, Wydawnictwo Literackie Kraków)
Interviews carried out during 1981-1982
1996: Discussions with Stanisław Lem (Dyskusje ze Stanisławem Lemem) , Warszaw 
1997: The collection A Stanislaw Lem Reader contains two interviews of Peter Swirski  with Lem:
 "Reflections on Literature, Philosophy, and Science", personal interview, June 1992
 "Lem in Nutshell", written interview, July 1994
2000: World on the Brink (:pl:Świat na krawędzi) interviews of Tomasz Fiałkowski with Lem
2002: Thus Spoke... Lem (Tako rzecze... Lem) -  Stanisław Bereś
Expanded edition of Conversations with Stanisław Lem, without censorship and expanded with the 2001 conversations.
2005: Patrick Grossmann,  "Stanislaw Lem. 'Intelligenz ist ein Rasiermesser'",  Lem's very last interview (an English translation at Lem's Fandom wiki)
2016: The World According to Lem (:pl:Świat według Lema), Peter Swirski
 Note: During 1991-1998 Lem used this title as a running header for his articles in Tygodnik Powszechny

Bibliographies
2010: Lech Keller: Visions of the future in the writings of Stanisław Lem, Vol. 2: "Annotated and Cross-Referenced Primary and Secondary Bibliography of Stanisław Lem",  Saarbrücken: Lap Lambert, 
2006 Переводы произведений Станислава Лема на русский язык (1955—1986) [Translations of Works of Stanislaw Lem in Russian (1955-1986)], by Konstantin Dushenko, НЛО, issue 6, 2006
2006 Переводы произведений Станислава Лема на русский язык (1987 — 2006): отдельные издания [Translations of Works of Stanislaw Lem in Russian (1955-1986): Selected Editions], M.F. Trifonov,  НЛО, issue 6, 2006
1997: A Stanislaw Lem Reader (edited by Peter Swirski) — includes Lem's brief bibliography
1986 Wolfgang Thadewald, Stanislaw Lem - Bibliographie für den deutschen Sprachraum (Bibliography of Lem's Works in the German Language) in: Florian Marzin, (ed.) Stanislaw Lem: An den Grenzen der SF und darüber hinaus Meitingen: Corian - very extensive bibliography of Lem's works  published in German

References

External links
KSIĄŻKI O LEMIE ("Books about Lem") - only in Polish language

Commemoration of Stanisław Lem
Lem, Stanislaw